Mario Wimmer is a cultural historian and theorist of history specializing in the history of the modern human and social sciences. Currently, he is managing director of the Collegium Helveticum and responsible for its academic programs. From 2013-2017, he taught in the Department of Rhetoric at the University of California, Berkeley.

Born and raised in Austria, Wimmer was trained in history, sociology, psychology, and science studies in Berlin and Vienna. Before he received his PhD in history from the University of Bielefeld in 2010 he also worked as a curator. Wimmer is considered a student of Reinhart Koselleck and Peter Schöttler, a student of Louis Althusser.

His first book Archival Bodies. A History of Historical Imagination is an investigation into the character of historical knowledge and was ranked among the ten best first books in German in 2012. Wimmer received numerous European fellowships and awards. He is a member of the International Network for the Theory of History. Recently he was listed among the world's leading theorists of history.

Selected publications
 Archivkörper. Eine Geschichte historischer Einbildungskraft, Konstanz University Press, 2012 (re-edited 2013).
 "The Last Judgment before the Last," Modern Intellectual History, (2021): 1-18 (DOI:10.1017/S1479244321000305).
 "Kittsteiner's History out of Joint," Journal of the Philosophy of History, 15 (2021) 3: 409–425 (DOI:10.1163/18722636-12341469).
 "The Afterlives of Scholarship: Warburg and Cassirer," History of Humanities, 2 (2017) 1: 245-270 (DOI: 10.1086/690581).
 "On Sources. Mythical and Historical Thinking in Fin-de-Siècle Vienna," Res. Journal for Anthropology and Aesthetics,  2 (2013) 1: 108–124 (https://www.jstor.org/stable/23647758).
 "Conceptual History: Begriffsgeschichte," in: James D. Wright (editor-in-chief), International Encyclopedia of the Social & Behavioral Sciences, 2nd edition, Vol 4. Oxford: Elsevier, 2015: 548–554. 
 "Zur Ökonomie des Dilettantismus: Aby Warburgs Kredit," Neue Rundschau, 128 (2017) 3: 69-81.
 Von der Arbeit des Historikers Ein Wörterbuch zu Theorie und Praxis der Geschichtswissenschaft (Melanges Peter Schöttler), co-editor with Anne Kwaschik, Bielefeld: Transcript 2012.

References

Year of birth missing (living people)
Living people
21st-century Austrian historians
Cultural historians